Saint-Louis is a commune in the Haut-Rhin department in Alsace in north-eastern France.

The inhabitants are called Ludoviciens.

History 
Following the conquest of the Sundgau and other parts of the Alsace by France in the course of the Thirty Years' War and the Peace of Westphalia, the French crown took a growing interest in the control and security of the land west of the Rhine at the Rhine knee below the territory of the Canton of Basel (which joined the Old Swiss Confederacy in 1501). In 1679, therefore, as part of a deliberation proclamation of his continued expansion policy on the Upper Rhine (which included the capture of Colmar in 1673, the defeat of imperial and Palatine troops at Türckheim, the plundering of the town in 1675, and the Treaties of Nijmegen in 1679), Louis XIV ordered the construction of Hüningen Fortress at this strategic point. The occupants of the place, the fishing village of Hüningen, had to leave to make way for this military fortification, the construction of which was carried out by fortress architect, Vauban in 1680. The villagers were rehoused in the newly founded Village-Neuf and on the road from Basle to Paris via Mulhouse, where the first element of the present day village of Saint-Louis was established on the state border. This settlement, consisting of several border guards and taverns was initially part of the municipality of Hüningen's "new village". On 26 November 1684 — around 3 years after the high point of France's policy of annexation or  — the capture of Strasbourg - the town was officially named by Louis XIV. Its patron is not actually the Sun King himself, but his predecessor, the canonized King Louis IX or Saint Louis.

In the course of the French Revolution the town was renamed from 1793 to 1814 as Bourglibre.

In 1953 the municipality of Bourgfelden was incorporated and was followed in 1958 by the village of Neuweg from Blotzheim. Since then most of the land of Basel-Mulhouse Airport has been on the soil of the town of Saint-Louis.

The association was turned into an agglomeration community in 2016.

Geography
Saint-Louis is located at the German and Swiss borders, just north of Basel. The EuroAirport Basel Mulhouse Freiburg is situated on its territory. The town is served by two railway stations on the line Mulhouse–Basel: Saint-Louis station and Saint-Louis-la-Chaussée station.

The commune of Saint-Louis also contains the former villages of Bourgfelden and Neuweg (also known as Saint-Louis-la-Chaussée, or Näiwaag in Sundgau Alsatian).

Population

Economy

Swiss International Air Lines is headquartered on the grounds of EuroAirport Basel-Mulhouse-Freiburg in Saint-Louis; while the airport is physically in France, the Swiss head office lies in the Swiss zone of the airport, and it may only be accessed from Switzerland. Hello, a Swiss airline, had its head office in the General Aviation area of EuroAirport.

Prior to the formation of Swiss International Air Lines, the regional airline Crossair was headquartered on the grounds of EuroAirport. Prior to its dissolution, Crossair Europe was headquartered on the grounds of EuroAirport. The airline Farnair Switzerland formerly had its head office at EuroAirport. As in the case of the Swiss head office, the area with the former Farnair head office may only be accessed from Switzerland. The head office moved to its current location, the Villa Guggenheim in Allschwil, in proximity to EuroAirport, on 1 October 2011.

Education
Maternelles (preschools) include Louis Armand, Baerenfels, Octavie Krafft, Nussbaum, Petite Camargue, Jules Verne, and Wallart. There are two Écoles élémentaires, École de Bourgfelden and École Galilée. Combined maternelle and primaire groupes scolaires are La Cigogne / Victor Hugo and Widemann / Sarasin.

Collège Georges Forlen and Collège Schickele are the junior high schools.

Lycée Jean-Mermoz serves sixth form/senior high school students.

Climate 
Saint-Louis features a temperate oceanic climate (Köppen: Cfb) but its location further away from the ocean gives the city colder winters with some snow, and often hot and humid summers, in comparison with the rest of France.

See also

 Communes of the Haut-Rhin department

References

External links

www.saint-louis.fr — official site 

Communes of Haut-Rhin
France–Switzerland border crossings